Marche-en-Famenne (literally "Marche in Famenne") is a city and municipality of Wallonia located in the Belgian province of Luxembourg.

The municipality consists of the following districts: Aye, Hargimont, Humain, Marche-en-Famenne, On, Roy, and Waha.

Other population centres include Grimbiémont, Hollogne, Lignières, Marloie, and Verdenne.

History

Middle Ages
In the early Middle Ages, Marche was just a little hamlet on the Marchette brook, one of the dependencies of the nearby Abbey of Stavelot. In the 12th century, this territory was made part of the County of La Roche.  It was ideally located, on the main road between Namur and Luxembourg City, and quickly evolved into a town, which obtained its charter in the 13th century.  At the end of the century, in true medieval fashion, it acquired a complete system of defensive walls, with two gates, a series of watchtowers, and a keep.  The market place and religious organizations, such as the Carmes convent founded in 1473, could thrive inside the closed city.

After 1500
When in 1555 Philip II of Spain, son of Charles V, inherited his father's empire, the freedoms of Spain’s Seventeen Provinces to the north were reduced considerably, giving rise to the Eighty Years' War. In the aftermath of the Pacification of Ghent, Don John of Austria, Philip II’s half brother, granted the Perpetual Edict, which was signed in the city in February 1577. The edict allowed for the departure of the Spanish troops and recognized most of the city’s freedoms, with the notable exception of religion.  The war started again and Don John died a year later near Namur.

The castle and defensive walls were dismantled at the end of the 17th century on the orders of Louis XIV.  A century later, the French Revolutionary troops entered the city and closed the convent.  Today, with its schools, light industries, military complex, and tourist attractions, Marche is a vibrant regional centre.

Sights

The city centre includes a few interesting buildings, such as the St Remacle church and the old Carmes convent.
The city is the home of several museums, including a lace museum, which is housed in one of the last remnants of the city’s medieval walls and commemorates the hundreds of lace workers that lived in the Marche area in the 18th century.
The Famenne museum gives a good overview of the region’s art and history.

Festivities
The Grosse Biesse (Great Beast) carnival takes place every year in February.  It features the beast, as well as the city's mascot Gugusse, traditional giants, and several other groups of joyful characters.
A folkloric group called La Plovinette (Fine Drizzle) specializes in traditional Walloon dancing.

Notable people from Marche-en-Famenne 
 Pierre Bailly, Belgian comics artist
 Jacques Beurlet, football player
 André Bouchat, politician
 Arnaud Brihay, Belgian artist
 Dany, Belgian comics artist
 Frans Depooter, Belgian painter
 Willy Deweert, Belgian writer
 Benoît Feroumont, Belgian comics artist
 Charles Hanin, politician
 Jean Jadot, Belgian engineer
 Joseph Nusbaum, Belgian architect
 Brigitte Olivier, Belgian judoka
 Phil, Belgian comics artist
 Luc Templier, writer

References

Further reading

External links

Official city web site (in French)
Official site of the tourism office (in French)
Alternative site (in French)
The Grosse Biesse carnival (in French)

 
Cities in Wallonia
Municipalities of Luxembourg (Belgium)